Delfim José da Silva was a Portuguese rower. He competed in the men's coxed four event at the 1948 Summer Olympics.

References

External links
 

Year of birth missing
Year of death missing
Portuguese male rowers
Olympic rowers of Portugal
Rowers at the 1948 Summer Olympics
Place of birth missing